The R601 road, also called the Timoleague–Courtmacsherry Road, is a regional road in Ireland, located in County Cork.

References

Regional roads in the Republic of Ireland
Roads in County Cork